Keita Cline (born 29 November 1974 in Saint Thomas, U.S. Virgin Islands) is an athlete who represented the British Virgin Islands.

Cline competed in two Olympics in three different events, at the 1996 Summer Olympics he entered the long jump where he finished 40th and the 4 × 100 metres relay the team finished 7th in the heat so didn't qualify for the next round, four years later at the 2000 Summer Olympics he was the only competitor from his country, he entered the 200 metres and finished 7th in his heat.

References

Living people
1974 births
People from Saint Thomas, U.S. Virgin Islands
Athletes (track and field) at the 1994 Commonwealth Games
Athletes (track and field) at the 1998 Commonwealth Games
Athletes (track and field) at the 2002 Commonwealth Games
Athletes (track and field) at the 2006 Commonwealth Games
Athletes (track and field) at the 1996 Summer Olympics
Athletes (track and field) at the 2000 Summer Olympics
British Virgin Islands male sprinters
British Virgin Islands long jumpers
Olympic athletes of the British Virgin Islands
Commonwealth Games competitors for the British Virgin Islands
Male long jumpers